The 1987–88 NCAA Division I men's ice hockey season began in October 1987 and concluded with the 1988 NCAA Division I Men's Ice Hockey Tournament's championship game on April 2, 1988 at the Olympic Center in Lake Placid, New York. This was the 41st season in which an NCAA ice hockey championship was held and is the 94th year overall where an NCAA school fielded a team.

After the season U.S. International would drop its hockey program (the school itself would eventually go bankrupt) causing the demise of the Great West Hockey Conference, the only principally west-coast conference in the history of Division I hockey.

Regular season

Season tournaments

Standings

1988 NCAA Tournament

Player stats

Scoring leaders

The following players led the league in points at the conclusion of the season.

  
GP = Games played; G = Goals; A = Assists; Pts = Points; PIM = Penalty minutes

Leading goaltenders

The following goaltenders led the league in goals against average at the end of the regular season while playing at least 33% of their team's total minutes.

GP = Games played; Min = Minutes played; W = Wins; L = Losses; OT = Overtime/shootout losses; GA = Goals against; SO = Shutouts; SV% = Save percentage; GAA = Goals against average

Awards

NCAA

CCHA

ECAC

Hockey East

WCHA

See also
 1987–88 NCAA Division III men's ice hockey season

References

External links
College Hockey Historical Archives
1987–88 NCAA Standings

 
NCAA